The Old Government Reserved Area (Old GRA) is a neighborhood of the city of Port Harcourt, Rivers State in Nigeria. It was primarily inhabited by European settlers during colonial times and was then referred to as the European quarters.

Old GRA is the location of the Rivers State House of Assembly, the People's Democratic Party Secretariat and the NEPAD Rivers State Secretariat. The neighborhood is also notable as the Port Harcourt home of Nigeria's previous first lady, Patience Jonathan.

Geography
As a mixed-use area, Old GRA combines residential, recreational and business uses. The neighborhood is bordered to the east by Abuloma, to the north by the D-line neighborhood, to the west by Diobu and Kidney Island and to the south by Borokiri.  It comprises the land covered by the Zip code 500241.

Education

Schools
Elementary and secondary schools or other educational establishments operating within Old GRA's boundaries include:
 Bereton Montessori Nursery and Primary School, 8 Ernest Ikoli Street
 Faith Baptist College, 2 Rumuoparaeli Street
 Sea Bed Model Primary School
 Port Harcourt Primary School (PHPS)
 Padod Model Primary School, 1 Eleme Street
 Maple Education Inc, 20 Igbodo Street
 Starlets Academy, 5 Yola Street

Landmarks
 Isaac Boro Park, public park established in the 1970s. Named after nationalist leader Isaac Boro.

Notable residents (past and present)
 Patience Jonathan (born 1957), former First Lady of Nigeria

References

External links

 
Old GRA
Neighbourhoods in Port Harcourt
European Nigerian culture in Rivers State